Bishop of Nelson may refer to:
The ordinary of the Anglican Diocese of Nelson (founded 1858)
The ordinary of the Roman Catholic Diocese of Nelson (founded 1936)